Ali Abd al-Rahman al-Faqasi al-Ghamdi (born 1973) is a citizen of Saudi Arabia who has been identified as a jihadist.
The BBC News reported his name was "Ali Abdul Rahman al-Ghamdi", CNN reported his name was "Ali Abd al-Rahman al-Faqasi al-Ghamdi".
They report Saudi Arabi had named him on a list of most wanted Saudi terrorism suspects.
There are three individuals named some variation of al Ghamdi on 
the Saudi most wanted list: Ali A. Al-Ghamdi, Hani S. Al-Ghamdi and Bandar A. Al-Ghamdi.

According to the BBC News Ali Abd al-Rahman al-Faqasi al-Ghamdi surrendered on June 26, 2003, shortly after he had been listed as the second most senior wanted individual on the first Saudi most wanted list.
They reported US officials asserted that he had been present in Afghanistan in late 2001, and that he had been present at the battle of Tora Bora.
They reported US officials also asserted he had been an associate of senior al Qaeda leaders
Saif al-Adel, Abu Mohammed al-Masri and Khalid Sheikh Mohammed.

Al-Ghamdi is one of the 20th hijacker suspects in the September 11 attacks.

He is reported to have played a role in organizing a suicide bombing in May 2003.

References

1973 births
Date of birth missing (living people)
Fugitives
Fugitives wanted by Saudi Arabia
Living people
Named on Saudi Arabia's list of most wanted suspected terrorists
People associated with the September 11 attacks
Saudi Arabian al-Qaeda members